The 1992 U.S. Pro Indoor was a men's tennis tournament played on indoor carpet courts that was part of the Championship Series of the 1992 ATP Tour. It was the 25th edition of the tournament and was played at the Spectrum in Philadelphia, Pennsylvania in the United States from February 17 to February 24, 1992. Second-seeded Pete Sampras won the singles title, his second at the event after 1990.

Finals

Singles

 Pete Sampras defeated  Amos Mansdorf 6–1, 7–6(7–4), 2–6, 7–6(7–2)
 It was Sampras' 1st singles title of the year and the 9th of his career.

Doubles

 Todd Woodbridge /  Mark Woodforde defeated  Jim Grabb /  Richey Reneberg 6–4, 7–6
 It was Woodbridge's 3rd title of the year and the 11th of his career. It was Woodforde's 3rd title of the year and the 14th of his career.

References

External links
 ITF tournament edition details

U.S. Pro Indoor
U.S. Pro Indoor
Ebel U.S. Pro Indoor
Ebel U.S. Pro Indoor
Ebel U.S. Pro Indoor